Jayveer Parmar (born 13 June 1998) is an Indian cricketer. He made his Twenty20 debut for Gujarat in the 2017–18 Zonal T20 League on 8 January 2018.

References

External links
 

1998 births
Living people
Indian cricketers
Gujarat cricketers
Place of birth missing (living people)